V. Alagirisamy was a member of the 11th Lok Sabha of India. He represented the Sivakasi constituency of Tamil Nadu and is a member of the Communist Party of India.

References

Communist Party of India politicians from Tamil Nadu

Possibly living people
Year of birth missing